Giles Cooper (born 11 August 1982) is a British actor. He is best known for playing Fred Silvester in the 2018 UK Tour of This House and food writer Nigel Slater in the 2019 London premiere of Toast.

Early life
Giles Cooper was born in Bath, UK. He is the grandson of BBC radio dramatist Giles Cooper.

Career
Giles Cooper trained at the Royal Central School of Speech and Drama. He has appeared in numerous stage plays including After the Dance at the Royal National Theatre in 2010, People and Henry V in 2012, The Duchess of Malfi and Knight Of the Burning Pestle at Shakespeare's Globe in 2014. He performed in the 2015 London revival of As Is. In 2018, he performed the role of Fred Silvester in the first national UK tour of This House. In 2019, it was announced that he would play food writer Nigel Slater in the stage adaption of Toast. In 2020, he reprised the role of Nigel for an audio version of Toast recorded during lockdown. The production raised money for the Lawrence Batley Theatre in Huddersfield.

Cooper's film credits include The Lady in the Van, directed by Nicholas Hytner, and Pride, directed by Matthew Warchus.

Filmography

Film & Television

Stage

References

1982 births
Living people
Alumni of the Royal Central School of Speech and Drama
British male actors